Ron Maurer (born March 10, 1963) is a Republican politician from the U.S. state of Oregon. He served in the Oregon House of Representatives until January 2011. He represented District 3, which encompasses most of Josephine County, including the cities of Grants Pass and Cave Junction. He ran for Oregon Superintendent of Public Instruction in 2010, losing to incumbent Susan Castillo. Following the election he took a job as the Director of the Congressional Liaison Service for the Department of Veterans Affairs in Washington, DC.

Early life and career
A fourth-generation Oregonian, Maurer was born in Grants Pass and graduated from Oregon State University in 1985 with a bachelor of science degree in science education. He went on to receive a masters in continuing and occupational education from Kansas State University in 1989, and a Doctor of Education degree from Northern Illinois University in 1999.

From 1985 to 1994, Maurer was an officer in the United States Army, serving as a medical evacuation helicopter pilot and then in healthcare and hospital administration. Following his active duty service, he served in the United States Army Reserves from 1994 until his retirement in 2006. From 2001 to 2009, Maurer owned and managed the Rogue River Health Clinic in Rogue River with his wife and was a co-owner of Maurer Properties, LLC.

Political career
Maurer served on the Grants Pass School District board from 2001 to 2004. In 2006, he was elected to the Oregon House of Representatives, representing District 3, defeating Democrat Howard Owens. In 2008, he was re-elected, defeating Democrat Julie Rubenstein and was elected Republican whip by his Republican colleagues.

In 2010, he ran for Oregon Superintendent of Public Instruction, losing to incumbent Susan Castillo in a closely contested election. He gave up running for reelection for the House in order to run for Superintendent and was succeeded by Wally Hicks.

Personal
Maurer and his wife Sheila have six children (Remington, Trista, Winchester, Eliza, Deringer, and Ruger). He lives in Winston-Salem, NC.

References

External links
 Legislative website
 Project VoteSmart biography

1963 births
Living people
People from Grants Pass, Oregon
Oregon State University alumni
United States Army officers
United States Army aviators
Kansas State University alumni
Northern Illinois University alumni
Republican Party members of the Oregon House of Representatives
21st-century American politicians
Military personnel from Oregon